The arrondissement of Roanne is located in the Loire department in the Auvergne-Rhône-Alpes region of France. It is composed of 113 communes.

Composition

The communes of the arrondissement of Roanne, and their INSEE codes, are:

 Ambierle (42003)
 Arcinges (42007)
 Arcon (42008)
 Balbigny (42011)
 Belleroche (42014)
 Belmont-de-la-Loire (42015)
 La Bénisson-Dieu (42016)
 Boyer (42025)
 Briennon (42026)
 Bully (42027)
 Bussières (42029)
 Le Cergne (42033)
 Champoly (42047)
 Chandon (42048)
 Changy (42049)
 Charlieu (42052)
 Chausseterre (42339)
 Cherier (42061)
 Chirassimont (42063)
 Combre (42068)
 Commelle-Vernay (42069)
 Cordelle (42070)
 Le Coteau (42071)
 Coutouvre (42074)
 Cremeaux (42076)
 Croizet-sur-Gand (42077)
 Le Crozet (42078)
 Cuinzier (42079)
 Écoche (42086)
 Fourneaux (42098)
 La Gresle (42104)
 Grézolles (42106)
 Jarnosse (42112)
 Juré (42116)
 Lay (42118)
 Lentigny (42120)
 Luré (42125)
 Mably (42127)
 Machézal (42128)
 Maizilly (42131)
 Mars (42141)
 Montagny (42145)
 Nandax (42152)
 Neaux (42153)
 Néronde (42154)
 Neulise (42156)
 Noailly (42157)
 Les Noës (42158)
 Nollieux (42160)
 Notre-Dame-de-Boisset (42161)
 Ouches (42162)
 La Pacaudière (42163)
 Parigny (42166)
 Perreux (42170)
 Pinay (42171)
 Pommiers-en-Forez (42173)
 Pouilly-les-Nonains (42176)
 Pouilly-sous-Charlieu (42177)
 Pradines (42178)
 Régny (42181)
 Renaison (42182)
 Riorges (42184)
 Roanne (42187)
 Sail-les-Bains (42194)
 Saint-Alban-les-Eaux (42198)
 Saint-André-d'Apchon (42199)
 Saint-Bonnet-des-Quarts (42203)
 Saint-Cyr-de-Favières (42212)
 Saint-Cyr-de-Valorges (42213)
 Saint-Denis-de-Cabanne (42215)
 Sainte-Agathe-en-Donzy (42196)
 Sainte-Colombe-sur-Gand (42209)
 Saint-Forgeux-Lespinasse (42220)
 Saint-Georges-de-Baroille (42226)
 Saint-Germain-la-Montagne (42229)
 Saint-Germain-Laval (42230)
 Saint-Germain-Lespinasse (42231)
 Saint-Haon-le-Châtel (42232)
 Saint-Haon-le-Vieux (42233)
 Saint-Hilaire-sous-Charlieu (42236)
 Saint-Jean-Saint-Maurice-sur-Loire (42239)
 Saint-Jodard (42241)
 Saint-Julien-d'Oddes (42243)
 Saint-Just-en-Chevalet (42248)
 Saint-Just-la-Pendue (42249)
 Saint-Léger-sur-Roanne (42253)
 Saint-Marcel-de-Félines (42254)
 Saint-Marcel-d'Urfé (42255)
 Saint-Martin-d'Estréaux (42257)
 Saint-Martin-la-Sauveté (42260)
 Saint-Nizier-sous-Charlieu (42267)
 Saint-Pierre-la-Noaille (42273)
 Saint-Polgues (42274)
 Saint-Priest-la-Prugne (42276)
 Saint-Priest-la-Roche (42277)
 Saint-Rirand (42281)
 Saint-Romain-d'Urfé (42282)
 Saint-Romain-la-Motte (42284)
 Saint-Symphorien-de-Lay (42289)
 Saint-Victor-sur-Rhins (42293)
 Saint-Vincent-de-Boisset (42294)
 Sevelinges (42300)
 Souternon (42303)
 La Tuilière (42314)
 Urbise (42317)
 Vendranges (42325)
 Vézelin-sur-Loire (42268)
 Villemontais (42331)
 Villerest (42332)
 Villers (42333)
 Violay (42334)
 Vivans (42337)
 Vougy (42338)

History

The arrondissement of Roanne was created in 1800.

As a result of the reorganisation of the cantons of France which came into effect in 2015, the borders of the cantons are no longer related to the borders of the arrondissements. The cantons of the arrondissement of Roanne were, as of January 2015:

 Belmont-de-la-Loire
 Charlieu
 La Pacaudière
 Néronde
 Perreux
 Roanne-Nord
 Roanne-Sud
 Saint-Germain-Laval
 Saint-Haon-le-Châtel
 Saint-Just-en-Chevalet
 Saint-Symphorien-de-Lay

References

Roanne